Guillermo Andrés Vernetti (born 17 April 1993) is an Argentine professional footballer who plays as an attacking midfielder for Santamarina.

Career
Vernetti started his career with Ferro Carril Oeste. He made his professional debut on 8 June 2014 in a Primera B Nacional win over Brown. Vernetti scored two goals during a fixture with Atlético Paraná in February 2015, which were the first of a subsequent thirteen goals across the six seasons the midfielder spent with Ferro Carril Oeste; most notably netting seven during 2016–17. On 23 August 2018, Vernetti joined fellow Primera B Nacional side Mitre. Eight appearances followed.

July 2019 saw Vernetti head across the second tier to Defensores de Belgrano. He debuted off the bench during a goalless draw away to Gimnasia y Esgrima on 18 August. He'd appear eight further times for the club, though just one of which was as a starter. In January 2021, having not featured in the shortened 2020 campaign, Vernetti went to El Salvador with Primera División outfit Isidro Metapán.

Career statistics
.

References

External links

1993 births
Living people
Footballers from Rosario, Santa Fe
Argentine footballers
Association football midfielders
Argentine expatriate footballers
Expatriate footballers in El Salvador
Argentine expatriate sportspeople in El Salvador
Primera Nacional players
Ferro Carril Oeste footballers
Club Atlético Mitre footballers
Defensores de Belgrano footballers
A.D. Isidro Metapán footballers
Club y Biblioteca Ramón Santamarina footballers